The 1999–2000 Colorado Avalanche season was the Avalanche's fifth season. It was the first season in the new Pepsi Center arena.

Regular season
December 12, 1999: Colorado beat the Vancouver Canucks, and Patrick Roy, who earned that decision, won his 424th game, surpassing Tony Esposito on the all-time list.
March 4, 2000: Colorado beat the Tampa Bay Lightning, and Patrick Roy earned the 435th victory of his career, surpassing Jacques Plante on the all-time list.

Season standings

Schedule and results

Playoffs

Western Conference Quarterfinals: (3) Colorado Avalanche vs. (6) Phoenix Coyotes

Western Conference Semifinals: (3) Colorado Avalanche vs. (4) Detroit Red Wings

Western Conference Finals: (2) Dallas Stars vs. (3) Colorado Avalanche

Player statistics

Awards and records

Team trophies

Player awards and trophies

Transactions

Trades

Draft picks
Colorado's draft picks at the 1999 NHL Entry Draft held at the FleetCenter in Boston, Massachusetts.

See also
1999–2000 NHL season

References

The Internet Hockey Database
Colorado Avalanche Database
Official National Hockey League Site

Colorado
Colorado
Colorado Avalanche seasons
Colorado
Colorado